Shalabh Umeshchandra Shrivastava (born 2 February 1986) is an Indian first-class cricketer. He is a right-handed batsman for Vidarbha and made his first-class debut in 2005. He was made the captain of Vidarbha for 2013–14 Ranji Trophy.

References

External links
 

1986 births
Living people
Vidarbha cricketers
Indian cricketers
Central Zone cricketers